LGE may refer to:

 Linear gingival erythema, a periodontal disorder
 LG Electronics, South Korea
 Louisville Gas & Electric, LG&E, Kentucky, US
 Lycée de Garçons Esch-sur-Alzette, a high school in Luxembourg
 Lateral ganglionic eminence, a developmental brain structure.
 Long Eaton railway station, National Rail station code
 Lions Gate Entertainment, US
 Lake Gregory Airport, IATA airport code "LGE"